Žibert is a Slovene surname, a variant of Siebert. Notable people with the surname include:

Anja Bah Žibert (born 1973),  Slovenian politician
Urban Žibert (born 1992), Slovenian footballer 

Slovene-language surnames